Nelluvai is a small village in the Thrissur district, Kerala, India. It is located between the towns Thrissur and Guruvayur, Kunnamkulam, and is known for the temple of Lord Dhanvantari. It comes under Erumapetty Panchayath. It belongs to the central Kerala Division. It is located 21 km north from District headquarters Thrissur, 12 km from Wadakkanchery, and 303 km from the state capital Thiruvananthapuram. Nelluvai's pin code is 680584 and postal head office is Erumapetty. Nelluvai is surrounded by Mangad village to the east, Kuttanchery village to the north, Muringatheri Village towards the north and Erumapetty village towards the west. Kunnamkulam, Shoranur, Thrissur, and Wadakkancheri are the nearby cities.

Demographics
 India census, Nelluwaya had a population of 5495 with 2601 males and 2894 females.

References

Villages in Thrissur district